This is a list of lighthouses in Libya, which are all located along the Mediterranean coastline of this North African country. The list includes those maritime lighthouses that are named landfall lights, or that have a range of at least twelve nautical miles. The NGA numbers are from the List of lights publication 113.

Lighthouses

Historic lighthouses

Leptis Magna Lighthouse – Located in the ruins of the Roman city of Leptis Magna it was a lighthouse that was in use between 200 and 455 AD. It has been estimated that the multi-level tower once stood 35m high. A substantial part of the lower storey still remains at the site, on a headland overlooking the now silted-up harbour.

See also
List of lighthouses in Tunisia (to the west)
List of lighthouses in Egypt (to the east)
Lists of lighthouses and lightvessels

References

External links

Libya
Lighthouse
Lighthouses